Mount Moriah station is a trolley stop on the SEPTA subway–surface 13 trolley in Southwest Philadelphia.

Located on the northeast corner of Kingsessing Avenue and Cemetery Avenue, there is a loop there for trolleys that do not go on the full route to Yeadon or Darby to turn around and go back to Center City Philadelphia. The stop is named for the Mount Moriah Cemetery next to the stop. The cemetery is named after Mount Moriah in Jerusalem, Israel and the Biblical Book of Genesis.

External links 

 Loop from Google Maps Street View

SEPTA Subway–Surface Trolley Line stations
Railway stations in Philadelphia
Southwest Philadelphia